Reynold Alleyne Nicholson, FBA (18 August 1868 – 27 August 1945), or R. A. Nicholson, was an eminent English orientalist, scholar of both Islamic literature and Islamic mysticism and widely regarded as one of the greatest Rumi (Mevlana or Mawlana) scholars and translators in the English language.

Life
The son of Henry Alleyne Nicholson, he was born at Keighley, West Riding of Yorkshire, England and died at Chester, Cheshire. He was educated at Aberdeen University and Trinity College, Cambridge, where he won the Porson Prize twice.

Nicholson was professor of Persian at University College London from 1901 to June 1902, then lecturer in Persian at the University of Cambridge from 1902 to 1926, and Sir Thomas Adams's Professor of Arabic at the University of Cambridge from 1926 to 1933. He is considered a leading scholar in Islamic literature and Islamic mysticism who exercised a lasting influence on Islamic studies. He was able to study and translate major Sufi texts in Arabic, Persian, Punjabi and Ottoman Turkish to English.  Nicholson wrote two very influential books: Literary History of The Arabs (1907) and The Mystics of Islam (1914).

He was one of the original trustees of the Gibb Memorial Trust.

Works 

 Studies in Islamic Mysticism, Cambridge University Press, 1921.

Works on Rumi
Nicholson's magnum opus was his work on Rumi's Masnavi, published in eight volumes between 1925 and 1940. He produced the first critical Persian edition of the Masnavi, the first full translation of it into English, and the first commentary on the entire work in English. This work has been highly influential in the field of Rumi studies worldwide.

Work on Ali Hujwiri Daata Ganj Bakhsh
Nicholson translated the famous Persian book on sufism Kashf ul Mahjoob in English written by famous saint of Subcontinent 
Ali Hujwiri Daata Ganj Bakhsh

Works on Iqbal
Being a teacher of the then Indian scholar and poet Muhammad Iqbal, Nicholson translated Iqbal's first philosophical Persian poetry book Asrar-i-Khudi into English as The Secrets of the Self.

Other significant translations
 The Sufi treatise of Hujviri
 Rumi's Mathnawi and Divan e Shams
 Ibn Arabi's Tarjuman al-Aswaq (1911)
 Poetry by the Sindhi language poet Shah Abdul Latif Bhittai
Poetry by the Punjabi language poet Bulleh Shah

Students
Among Nicholson's students was A. J. Arberry, a translator of Rumi and the Quran. Another student, Muhammad Iqbal was the famous poet and has been called the "Spiritual Father of Pakistan".

See also
Persian literature
Sufi poetry
Iranology
Ali Hujwiri
Rumi
Iqbal
The Secrets of the Self

References

External links

 
 
 
 A Literary History of the Arabs (1907) at Google Books
 The Mystics of Islam (1914) at Google Books
 Encyclopædia Britannica's entry for Reynold Nicholson
 
 Short bio of Rumi by Reynold Alleyne Nicholson
 The Secrets of the Self, from Iqbal Academy

1868 births
1945 deaths
People from Keighley
English orientalists
Iranologists
British Arabists
Iqbal scholars
British scholars of Islam
Rumi scholars
Sir Thomas Adams's Professors of Arabic
Alumni of the University of Aberdeen
Alumni of Trinity College, Cambridge
British translators